Braswell may refer to:

Places
 Braswell, Georgia, a city in the US
 Braswell, Missouri, an unincorporated community in the US

People
 Almon Glenn Braswell (1943–2006), American business owner
 Arnold W. Braswell (born 1925), retired United States Air Force general
 Bobby Braswell (born 1962), American college basketball coach
 Elizabeth J. Braswell, American novelist
 Jerry Braswell Jr. (born 1975), American basketball player
 Kevin Braswell (born 1979), American basketball player
 Natalie Braswell, American lawyer and public servant
 Tony Braswell, American politician and businessman
 Braswell Deen Jr. (born 1925), American politician and judge
 Braswell Deen (1893–1981), U.S. Representative from Georgia

Other uses
 Braswell (SOC), an Intel microprocessor